Basra is the capital of Basra Governorate, in Iraq.

Basra may also refer to:

Places

Iraq
 Basra Governorate, a governorate in southern Iraq
 Basra Province, Ottoman Empire
 Basra International Airport
 University of Basrah

Other places
 Basra-ye Bala, Mazandaran Province, Iran
 Basra-ye Pain, Mazandaran Province, Iran
 Basra, Morocco, archaeological site in Morocco
 Basra, Pakistan, village in Chakwal District, Pakistan
 Basrah, Yemen, a village in Yemen

Battles
 Battle of Basra (1914), a battle between British and Ottoman troops in World War I
 Battle of Basra (2003), one of the first battles of the 2003 invasion of Iraq, involving the British 7 Armoured Brigade
 Battle of Basra (2008), an operation by the Iraqi Army to drive the Mahdi Army militia out of the city

People
 Al-Hariri of Basra (1054–1122), Arab poet, scholar of the Arabic language and a high government official of the Seljuk Empire
 Asif Basra (1967–2020), Indian actor
 David of Basra (3rd- and 4th-century CE), Christian Metropolitan bishop 
 Geeta Basra (born 1984), Bollywood actress
 Riaz Basra (1967–2002), Pakistani militant

Other uses
 Basra (game), a card game widely played in Lebanon and Egypt
 Basra (album), a 1965 Blue Note jazz album by Pete La Roca, featuring Joe Henderson
 Basra (2008 film), a 2008 Egyptian film
 Basra, a 2010 Hindi film directed by Navdeep Singh

See also

 1991 uprising in Basra, the scene of the beginning of the unrest in Iraq following the Gulf War
 Basra reed warbler, a bird endemic in Iraq and Israel
 Basara (disambiguation)
 Basar (disambiguation)
 Barsa (disambiguation)